Is a former college in Owosso, Michigan.  It began in 1949 as Owosso Bible College.  In 1958 it was reorganized from a Bible college to a Christian liberal arts college and renamed it Owosso College.  About this same time it merged with Eastern Pilgrim College.  In 1972 Kenneth Armstrong became the president of the college and renamed it John Wesley College.

In 1974 the school received regional accreditation for the first time.  However the school shortly later went into bankruptcy and closed in 1981.  Several years later the campus was acquired by Baker College.

Sources
a website on Shiawassee County history

Educational institutions established in 1949
Defunct private universities and colleges in Michigan
Educational institutions disestablished in 1981
1949 establishments in Michigan